Jal El Dib or Jal Ed Dib  is a Lebanese city in the kaza of Matn in the Mount Lebanon Governorate.

References

External links
 Jall Ed Dib - Bqennaya, Localiban

Populated places in the Matn District
Maronite Christian communities in Lebanon
Eastern Orthodox Christian communities in Lebanon